Florica Silaghi (born 4 May 1957) is a Romanian rower. She competed in the women's coxed four event at the 1980 Summer Olympics.

References

External links
 

1957 births
Living people
Romanian female rowers
Olympic rowers of Romania
Rowers at the 1980 Summer Olympics
Place of birth missing (living people)